Robert Costello (born July 26, 1965) is an American equestrian. He competed in the individual eventing at the 2000 Summer Olympics.

References

1965 births
Living people
American male equestrians
Olympic equestrians of the United States
Equestrians at the 2000 Summer Olympics
Pan American Games medalists in equestrian
Pan American Games gold medalists for the United States
Equestrians at the 2003 Pan American Games
Sportspeople from Beverly, Massachusetts
Medalists at the 2003 Pan American Games